Chillogallo is an urban parish of the city of Quito, Ecuador. It is located in the southern part of the city.

Parishes of Quito Canton